Martin Dvořák was born in Brno (Czech Republic) in 1979. He received his professional dance education at the Dance Conservatory in Brno, from which he graduated in 1997. He advanced his education at the Anton Bruckner Privat University in Linz where he enrolled in the master's degree program in Contemporary Dance Movement Research (he graduated from the program in 2013). As a dancer, Dvořák is versatile in various dance styles (classical, modern, contemporary, and dance-theatre). He collaborated on a number of projects with the following companies:

Oper Graz (Austria), Theater an der Wien / Kammeroper Wien (Austria), Ich bin OK Dance Company (Austria), Tanz Company Gervasi (Austria), Staatstheater Kassel (Germany), Cie. ProART (Czech Republic), Fabulous Beast Dance Theatre / English National Opera London (Ireland/England), Ballet of Landestheater Linz (Austria), Tanztheater Homunculus Wien (Austria), Kulturforum Fürth/Nürnberg, Staatstheater Darmstadt (Germany), Ballet Vorpommern / Ostsee-Festspiele Greifswald (Germany), Tanzquartier / ImPulsTanz Wien (Austria), Dance Theatre of Tiroler Landestheater Innsbruck (Austria), Ballet Bern (Switzerland), Volksoper Wien / Tanztheater Wien (Austria), Magyar Festival Ballet in Budapest (Hungary), Ballet Prague - Prague Chamber Ballet (Czech Republic), J. K. Tyl Theatre in Pilsen (Czech Republic), Laterna Magika Ballet in Prague (Czech Republic), Brno National Theatre Ballet (Czech Republic).

Over the years, Dvořák collaborated on about 90 works with more than 50 choreographers: Nir Ben Gal, Elio Gervasi, Johannes Wieland, Chris Haring, Liz King, Jochen Ulrich, Catherine Guerin, Benoit Lachambre, Jiří Kylián, Stijn Celis, Felix Dumeril, Kaori Ito, Esther Balfe, Vangelis Legakis, Jo Strømgren, Jean Renshaw, Isira Makuloluwe, Michael Dolan, Pavel Šmok, Robert North, Libor Vaculík, Petr Zuska, Robert Balogh, Jochen Heckmann, Patrick Delcroix, Jean-Pierre Aviotte, Bruce Taylor, Petr Tyc, Georg Reischl, Michael Klien, David Terlingo, Nicholas Mortimore, Rose Breuss, Christophe Winkler, Lode Devos, Michael D'Auzon, Antonio Gomes, Ivan Markó, Nikolaus Adler, Gabriel Wong, Mei Hong Lin, Emma Murray, Anil van der Zee, Lazaro Godoy, Mani Obeya, Daphne Strothmann, Martin Gruber, Neil Paris, Vladislav Benito Šoltýs, Eva Klimáčková and Jan Březina.

Since 2004, Dvořák has been working as artistic director at the ProART Festival - an international workshop festival of dance, acting, singing, and photography; and as artistic leader of the ProART Company based in Prague and Brno. He also teaches yoga, ballet, improvisation, and contemporary dance.

Choreographer, director, author 
In Vienna Dvořák became aware of new directions in choreography, which he sought to develop in his own work. As a young choreographer, he created two choreographies for Dance Theatre Antares ("Den Toten Der Heimat" - 2002, "Gabriel Lion" - 2003), and collaborated on the production of "Der Verlorene Atem" - Schauspielhaus Wien in Vienna and with Dance Conservatory in Prague. Since 2004, he has worked as an independent choreographer. To date, he created more than 30 original dance works which were presented in Germany, France, Austria, Italy, Israel, South Korea, Poland, Hungary, Slovakia, Portugal, Kenya, the United Kingdom and Malta. Also notable are his collaborations with directors Brigitte Fassbaender, Rainer Mennicken, Matthias Davids, Karl Sibelius, Jean Renshaw, Karel Drgáč, and Eva-Maria Höckmayr.

 2004 – a freelance project "Gabriel Lion 2004" at the Terezín Memorial event “Terezínská Tryzna”, and as part of Czech Dance Platform. The project was presented in thirteen theatres in the Czech Republic and Slovak Republic.
 2005 - a dance theatre project based on a story by Joseph Heller - "I don´t like you anymore" (HaDivadlo Brno, Alfred ve dvoře in Prague) – formation of Company ProART -   a choreography in Innsbruck - "InUNSERirgendwo", "Interviews with loneliness" (a ProART Festival 2005 project in Brno), "Banks of Ganges" (a festival opera project in Rakovnik).
 2006 - "Salome" (opera, Landestheater Innsbruck), "Who's afraid?" (Company ProART), "... as in heaven" (ProART Festival 2006 project), "Trio in 6" (for Landestheater Innsbruck) "BAROKO - In the Men´s Arms" for the Company ProART (Czech-German-Austrian project of Baroque opera and contemporary dance theatre).
 2007 - "Fear and/or Desire" (for Landestheater Linz), "Trittico Botticelliano" and "Birds" (for the Municipal Theatre in Brno - Moravian Autumn Festival), "Never Sent Letters" (for Reduta Theatre in Brno), "Reality Boulevard" (Company ProART).
 2008 - "Helden Haft - 6 Tage Rennen" - a project in collaboration with the Dresden Tanzwochen (Prague, Brno, Essen, Dresden), "Mother Stood" - a miniature for Irene Bauer (Company ProART), "Quartet for 2" - a duet for a choreographic studio of the National Theatre Ballet in Brno.
 2009 - dance production of "Memoires" for the Company ProART and "Matchgirl Opera" with the music of Tiger Lilies for Landestheater Linz
 2010 - "Giselle: Revenge" for the Company ProART, "Simple Total Beauty" for the Junior ProART Company
 2011 - opera "The Cunning Little Vixen" from Leoš Janáček for Landestheater Linz, "Foreign Bodies" for Company ProART in cooperation with the Brno Philharmonic Orchestra, "Brotherhood" and "Beethoven-Tolstoy-Janáček: The Kreutzer Sonata" for the Company ProART
 2012 – Igor Stravinsky´s dance pantomime "The Soldier's Tale", co-produced by the Brno Philharmonic Orchestra and ProART, "Rigoletto" – opera from Giuseppe Verdi for Landestheater Linz, "String Quartets" (Intimate Letters) for ProART
 2013 - "SFIDA FURIOSO" - solo dance piece on a theme of Pier Paolo Pasolini´s life and work (ProART Company in coproduction with Centre for Choreography of Johannes Kresnik, Austria) and "Milada", inspired and dedicated to Milada Horáková, a Czech national hero and a political victim of Nazi regime during the WWII 
 2014 - "OTA PAVEL - RAŠKA", a dance theatre piece for Balet DFXŠ in Liberec, "USPUD_emoticon" - dance theatre production for UNESCO heritage Villa Tugendhat in Brno (ProART Company), world premiere staging of Erik Satie´s ballet Uspud, "Motion Scores" - dance evening of 10 international choreographers with music of 10 Czech composers (ProART Company), "Another Jan" - a dance piece as part of a tribute to the victims of communism: Milada Horáková, Jan Palach and brothers Mašín.
 2015 - "Poets of the City" - a double bill dance theatre  (Blatný + Vitka) as an hommage to Czech composer Vítězslava Kaprálová and Czech poet Ivan Blatný for the UNESCO heritage Villa Tugendhat in Brno (ProART Company); "Schubert: Winter Journey" - a psychological musical theatre (Kammeroper Wien - ProART Company); Choreography and dance of "Magic Flute" of W. A. Mozart at Burgruine Reisberg (Austria), direction: Prof. Karel Drgáč)
 2016 - "Meeting in the Glassroom" - a series of interviews with various personalities of Czech cultural scene in Villa Tugendhat in Brno. Choreographies: Cadenza, Pilgrim Song, Fratres (with Zdenek Konvalina) for ProART Company and Ensemble Opera Diversa.

References

1979 births
Czech male dancers
Czech choreographers
Living people
Competitors at the 2005 World Games
Competitors at the 2009 World Games